The Bhutan women's national football team represents Bhutan in international women's football. The team is controlled by the governing body for football in Bhutan, the Bhutan Football Federation, which is currently a member of the Asian Football Federation and the regional body the South Asian Football Federation. Bhutan play their home games at the national stadium, Changlimithang. It is one of the younger national teams in the world having played its first match in 2010. Bhutan took part in the 2014 SAFF Women's Championship in Islamabad, Pakistan at the end of 2014, losing all three games, including a 4–1 loss to host Pakistan in which Tshering Yangdon scored just the second official goal in the team's history.

History

The beginning
Bhutanese football in general came to the international stage comparatively late in the day with the men's national team only playing their first competitive international match in 1982 and the only junior team to compete internationally, the Under-17s making their debut in 2003. The women's team did not enter any form of international competition until 2010. Prior to their entry into international football, a formal women's competition was established in Bhutan for the first time, supported by a grant from FIFA and run by the Bhutan Football Federation. Because of the very under-developed state of women's football in Bhutan at this time, club teams did not exist and so the tournament consisted of teams representing individual Dzongkhags. This competition was used not only to increase the popularity of football amongst women in the country, but also to act as means of identifying and coaching players who would form the first ever Bhutan women's national football squad.

Their first ever competitive game was a friendly match against Bangladesh in Dhaka on 6 December 2010 as a warm up for their appearance at the inaugural SAFF Women's Championships a week later. Unfortunately, their debut was one to forget as, having travelled to Cox's Bazar where all of the group matches were scheduled to take place, they succumbed 7–0 to their hosts. Their competition proper got off to an even worse start as they lost 18–0 to India, one of the strongest teams in the region. Bangladesh then repeated their performance in the pre-competition friendly running out 9–0 victors and eliminating Bhutan from the competition. The team were able to salvage some pride in their final game, drawing 1–1 with Sri Lanka, which marks their only positive result of any kind as well as their first competitive goal (one of two times they have scored a goal in a competitive match). Their performance at the SAFF Championships saw them gain 889 ranking points. Although they were at this stage only provisionally ranked in 127th and last place as they had not played the required number of five competitive matches against officially ranked teams, their performance saw them achieve a higher points total than four other provisionally ranked teams: the U.S. Virgin Islands, Liberia, Qatar and Afghanistan. Had they been officially ranked, their points tally would have placed them in 122nd place ahead of ranked nations Tanzania, Belize, Antigua and Barbuda and Botswana.

The women's team then withdrew from international football for the next two years, re-emerging to play in the 2012 SAFF Women's Championship. Prior to the tournament in Sri Lanka, the team of twenty five, including two referees and physiotherapists, but with the playing squad consisting entirely of students, flew to Bangkok for two weeks training to get accustomed to warmer weather. They entered the tournament provisionally ranked 34th out of 35 in the Asian Football Confederation, with only Afghanistan ranked below them, and unranked on the global listing because they had been inactive for more than eighteen months. At this point, with their points total of 889, they had a higher technical rating than twelve teams who were either unranked due to inactivity or provisionally ranked in last place due to insufficient competition and had more ranking points than five officially ranked teams: Iraq, Mozambique, Malawi, Antigua and Barbuda and Bostswana. The team travelled to Sri Lanka to play their fixtures at the Ceylonese Rugby & Football Club Grounds and were drawn in a group with the same teams as the previous edition of the tournament. Sri Lanka took advantage of their status as hosts in the first match, beating Bhutan 4–0, taking the lead after just four minutes through Nilushika Kumari, with Praveena Perera wrapping up the scoring at the end of the game following two goals either side of half time from Erandi Kumudumala. Bhutan performed better in their next game, a narrow 1–0 loss to Bangladesh, but this eliminated them from the tournament. Their final match against India was very one-sided, though not as great a defeat as last time, India still ran out victors 11–0 sending Bhutan home without a point or a goal.

Having now played the required five games against already ranked teams, Bhutan received their first official ranking position: 128th, ahead of Antigua and Barbuda and Botswana. Bhutan have not played a competitive match since the 2014 SAFF Championships, but due to movements around them, did climb to a high ranking of 115th in December 2013 The team took part in the 2014 SAFF Women's Championship held in November 2014 in Pakistan.

Team image

Home stadium
The Bhutan women's national football team plays their home matches on the Changlimithang Stadium.

Results and fixtures

The following is a list of match results in the last 12 months, as well as any future matches that have been scheduled.

Legend

2022

2023

Head-to-head record
As of October 2022:

Key

The following table shows Bhutan' all-time official international record per opponent:

Coaching staff

Current coaching staff

Manager history

Players

Current squad
The following 22 players were called up for the 2022 SAFF Women's Championship in Nepal from 6–19 September 2022.
Caps and goals are updated as of 9 September 2022 after the match against  Sri Lanka.

Recent call-ups
 The following players have been called up to a Bhutan squad in the past 12 months.

Records

Active players in bold, statistics correct as of 2020.

Most capped players

Top goalscorers

Competitive record

FIFA Women's World Cup

AFC Women's Asian Cup

SAFF Women's Championship

*Denotes draws includes knockout matches decided on penalty kicks. Red border indicates that the tournament was hosted on home soil. Gold, silver, bronze backgrounds indicates 1st, 2nd and 3rd finishes respectively. Bold text indicates best finish in tournament.

See also

Sport in Bhutan
Football in Bhutan
Women's football in Bhutan

National teams
Men's
Bhutan national football team
Bhutan national under-23 football team
Bhutan national under-20 football team
Bhutan national under-17 football team
Bhutan national futsal team
Women's
Bhutan women's national football team results

References

External links
 (BhutanFootball.org)

 
Asian women's national association football teams
Women's football in Bhutan